In baseball statistics, an error is an act, in the judgment of the official scorer, of a fielder misplaying a ball in a manner that allows a batter or baserunner to advance one or more bases or allows an at bat to continue after the batter should have been put out. The left fielder (LF) is one of the three outfielders, the defensive positions in baseball farthest from the batter. Left field is the area of the outfield to the left of a person standing at home plate and facing toward the pitcher's mound. The outfielders' duty is to try to catch long fly balls before they hit the ground or to quickly catch or retrieve and return to the infield any other balls entering the outfield. The left fielder must also be adept at navigating the area of left field where the foul line approaches the corner of the playing field and the walls of the seating areas. Being the outfielder closest to third base, the left fielder generally does not have to throw as far as the other outfielders to throw out runners advancing around the bases, so they often do not have the strongest throwing arm, but their throws need to be accurate. The left fielder normally plays behind the third baseman and shortstop, who play in or near the infield; unlike catchers and most infielders (excepting first basemen), who are virtually exclusively right-handed, left fielders can be either right- or left-handed. In the scoring system used to record defensive plays, the left fielder is assigned the number 7.

The list of career leaders is dominated by players from the early 20th century; only two of the top 16 players were active after 1945. Only four of the top 28 single-season totals were recorded after 1916, none after 1935; only four of the top 81 totals were recorded after 1940. To a large extent, the leaders reflect longevity rather than lower skill. Barry Bonds, whose 89 errors are the most by a National League (NL) left fielder since 1971, won eight Gold Glove Awards for defensive excellence.

Because game accounts and box scores often did not distinguish between the outfield positions, there has been some difficulty in determining precise defensive statistics prior to 1901; because of this, and because of the similarity in their roles, defensive statistics for the three positions are frequently combined. Although efforts to distinguish between the three positions regarding games played during this period and reconstruct the separate totals have been largely successful, separate error totals are unavailable; players whose totals are missing the figures for pre-1901 games are notated in the table below. Zack Wheat, who held the major league records for career games and putouts in left field for over 70 years, is the modern (post-1900) leader in career errors committed by a left fielder with 186, including the modern National League record of 184. Goose Goslin (184), Lou Brock (168), Bobby Veach (146), Jimmy Sheckard (139), Patsy Dougherty (133), Duffy Lewis (123), Bob Johnson (121), Jack Graney (114), Rickey Henderson (113), Ken Williams (109), Jesse Burkett (108), and Charlie Jamieson (103) are the only other left fielders charged with over 100 career errors after 1900. Justin Upton, who had 39 errors through the 2022 season to place him tied for 112th all-time, is the leader among active players.

Key

List

Other Hall of Famers

References

Baseball-Reference.com

Major League Baseball statistics
Major League Baseball lists